Forest Éireann is an Irish lobby group that claims to speak on behalf of smokers. It aims to replicate the activities of its parent group, FOREST, in the UK, an organisation that receives 96% of its funding  from the tobacco industry, including Gallaher PLC. In September 2010 Forest Éireann attracted its first news headlines by publishing a report claiming that the ban on indoor smoking in pubs hads been the cause of a decline in trade experienced by Irish pubs, and calling for the ban to be relaxed.

The parent organisation has been characterised by academic sources as a front group, as it was organised and funded by the tobacco industry and has generated little grassroots interest. According to internal memos, the tobacco industry designed FOREST to be controlled "through a third party, so that there would be no direct contact between tobacco company personnel or TAC and the director."

References

External links
 Forest Eireann

Tobacco smoking in Ireland
Political advocacy groups in the Republic of Ireland